Philip Kumar Reang is an Indian bru politician from Tripura. In 2023 Tripura Legislative Assembly election he won the election from Kanchanpur Assembly constituency and became member of Tripura Legislative Assembly.

References

Living people
Year of birth missing (living people)
Place of birth missing (living people)
Tripura MLAs 2023–2028
Tipra Motha Party politicians